Pump and dump may refer to:

 Pump and dump, a form of securities fraud
 The practice of discarding pumped breast milk tainted with alcohol, drugs or allergens that may harm an infant
 A one-night stand